Fired Up is an American sitcom television series created by Arleen Sorkin and Paul Slansky, that aired on NBC from April 10, 1997 to February 9, 1998, for two seasons and 28 episodes. The series, the first from Grammnet Productions, starred Sharon Lawrence as a self-centered promotions executive and Leah Remini as her mouthy assistant. When the pair got fired from their jobs, they teamed up to create a business as equal partners.  The tagline of the series was "First she got fired, then she got fired up."

Plot
Gwendolyn Leonard epitomized the term "self-involved."  After being fired from her corporate job, she was reduced to moving in with her former assistant, spunky Terry Reynolds, and starting up a new promotions business as her partner.  Terry and her brother Danny shared a loft apartment atop a clock tower in New York City, and Danny worked as bartender at Clockworks, the restaurant below, while he pursued his dream of becoming a writer.  Clockworks was owned by Guy Mann, an average Joe who adamantly pursued Gwen, though she kept him at arm's length (his response to each of her blow-offs was "Oh, yeah!").

Also regularly seen was Mrs. Francis, a crotchety unemployment agent whom Gwen ultimately inspired to quit her job and open an eggroll shop; Ashley Mann, Guy's son who worked as a female impersonator; Scott Bickley, Danny's lecherous agent who moonlighted as a suit salesman; and in later episodes Steve Summer, a former classmate of Gwen's who has carried a torch for her for decades.

Cast
Sharon Lawrence as Gwen Leonard
Leah Remini as Terry Reynolds
Mark Feuerstein as Danny Reynolds
Jonathan Banks as Guy Mann

Recurring
Mark Davis as Ashley Mann
Francesca P. Roberts as Mrs. Francis
Timothy Omundson as Scott Bickley
Thomas F. Wilson as Steve Summer

Notable Guest Stars
Kelsey Grammer as Tom Whitman
D.W. Moffett as James Collins
Dixie Carter as Rita Leonard
Jack Scalia as Frank Reynolds
Nicole Sullivan as Debbie
Don Cornelius as himself
Randee Heller as Tina Reynolds
John Aniston as Gordon

Episodes

Season 1 (1997)

Season 2 (1997–98)

History
Fired Up was a mid-season replacement on NBC. It premiered on April 10, 1997, and ended the first season on June 23 after 8 episodes. The second season premiered on September 22, 1997, and the last episode aired on February 9, 1998. It was a contemporary of shows like Caroline in the City and Suddenly Susan, and at one point, all three shows were part of a Monday-night promotion: "The Ladies of Monday Night."

Reception
Caryn James of The New York Times said the series had a "topical premise and an edgy lead character, just what most sitcoms lack" but that after a promising start, its first season episodes lost the "sharp writing this series needs."

Fired Up premiered in the "cushy Thursday night slot after Seinfeld" through May 15, 1997, on a night that NBC promoted as Must See TV.  It started out strong in the ratings; the premiere garnered an 18.8 rating and 29 share, but after NBC changed its timeslot, the show lost its audience and NBC canceled it.

Syndication
Fired Up had a brief syndication run on the USA Network.

References

External links 

 

Television series by CBS Studios
1990s American sitcoms
1997 American television series debuts
1998 American television series endings
1990s American workplace comedy television series
NBC original programming
English-language television shows
Television shows set in New York City